Browerville is a city in Todd County, Minnesota. The population was 790 at the time of the 2010 census.

History
Browerville was platted in 1882, and named after Jacob V. Brower (1844–1905), a county official. Browerville was incorporated in 1884. Two properties in town are on the National Register of Historic Places: the Kahlert Mercantile Store, built in 1883, and the Church of St. Joseph, completed in 1909.

Geography
The Long Prairie River, flows near the town's eastern boundary. Eagle and Harris Creeks join the river near town Browerville is along U.S. Highway 71, and County Roads 14 and 21.

Demographics

2010 census
As of the census of 2010, there were 790 people, 326 households, and 196 families living in the city. The racial makeup of the city was 95.3% White, 0.6% African American, 0.4% Native American, 0.5% Asian, 1.8% from other races, and 1.4% from two or more races. Hispanic or Latino of any race were 3.8% of the population.

There were 326 households, of which 31.6% had children under the age of 18 living with them, 40.2% were married couples living together, 16.3% had a female householder with no husband present, 3.7% had a male householder with no wife present, and 39.9% were non-families. 34.7% of all households were made up of individuals, and 18.1% had someone living alone who was 65 years of age or older. The average household size was 2.31 and the average family size was 2.95.

The median age in the city was 37.8 years. 26.8% of residents were under the age of 18; 6.9% were between the ages of 18 and 24; 24.3% were from 25 to 44; 24.8% were from 45 to 64; and 17.1% were 65 years of age or older. The gender makeup of the city was 48.1% male and 51.9% female.

2000 census
As of the census of 2000, there were 735 people, 318 households, and 181 families living in the city. The racial makeup of the city was 98.23% White, 0.54% Native American, 0.54% Asian, 0.14% from other races, and 0.54% from two or more races. Hispanic or Latino of any race were 0.95% of the population.

There were 318 households, out of which 27.7% had children under the age of 18 living with them, 47.5% were married couples living together, 6.9% had a female householder with no husband present, and 42.8% were non-families. 41.5% of all households were made up of individuals, and 27.0% had someone living alone who was 65 years of age or older. The average household size was 2.24 and the average family size was 3.10.

In the city, the population was spread out, with 25.3% under the age of 18, 6.7% from 18 to 24, 23.1% from 25 to 44, 22.6% from 45 to 64, and 22.3% who were 65 years of age or older. The median age was 41 years. For every 100 females, there were 78.0 males. For every 100 females age 18 and over, there were 72.6 males.

The median income for a household in the city was $26,250, and the median income for a family was $48,393. Males had a median income of $35,208 versus $24,375 for females. The per capita income for the city was $15,493. About 10.9% of families and 15.2% of the population were below the poverty line, including 18.0% of those under age 18 and 17.3% of those age 65 or over.

Government
The mayor is Bob Heid (elected 2014).

Education

Public schools
Browerville Public Schools are part of the Browerville Public School District. The elementary and high schools are attached, at 620 Park Avenue North. The average class size ranges between 40 and 55 students. Browerville sports teams use Tigers as their mascot. In fall, football and volleyball are offered. In winter, boys basketball, girls basketball, and wrestling are offered. In spring, softball, baseball, boys and girls golf, and boys and girls track are offered. Along with that, cheerleading is offered in fall and winter. The mascot used to be the Broncos when they were paired with differing school districts for sports, but now they stick with the tigers. Browerville school has an out door swimming pool and offers summer swimming programs.

Private schools
Christ the King Catholic Church runs a parochial K-6 school at 750 North Main Street. Christ the King resulted in the combination of the two historical Roman Catholic parishes in Browerville: St. Joseph (Polish) and St. Peter (German). The initiative to combine the parishes was taken by the Diocese of St. Cloud, rather than by the faithful of these two parishes.

Art 
Christ the King Catholic Church is home to the sculptures Christ Prays in Gethsemane and Comforting Angel.  Both pieces, found in the yard in front of the church, were sculpted by Browerville born Joseph Kiselewski in 1932. A number of Kiselewski's small sculptures, along with a photo display, can be seen at American Heritage Bank in Browerville

Notable people
LaVyrle Spencer, best-selling author of contemporary and historical romance novels; born in Browerville.
Joseph Kiselewski, sculptor; born in Browerville in 1901 and retired here in 1980.

References

External links
 City of Browerville Minnesota
 Browerville Public School District
 ePodunk: Profile for Browerville, Minnesota, MN
 Autobiography of Joseph Kiselewski

Cities in Minnesota
Cities in Todd County, Minnesota